Alejandro María Aguado y Remírez de Estenoz, 1st Marquess of Marismas del Guadalquivir (29 June 1784, in Sevilla – 14 Aprili 1842, in Gijon), Spanish banker, was born of Old Christian parentage, originally from Sevilla, Andalusia, Spain.

He began life as a soldier, fighting with distinction in the Spanish War of Independence first against the French, then on the side of Joseph Bonaparte. After the Battle of Bailén (1808) he entered the French army, in which he rose to be colonel and aide-de-camp to Marshal Soult.

He was exiled in 1815, and immediately started business as a commission-agent in Paris, where, chiefly through his family connexions in Havana and Mexico, he acquired in a few years enough wealth to enable him to undertake banking. The Spanish government gave him full powers to negotiate the loans of 1823, 1828, 1830 and 1831; and Ferdinand VII rewarded him with the title of Marquess of Marismas del Guadalquivir, the decorations of several orders and valuable mining concessions in Spain. Aguado also negotiated the Greek loan of 1834. In 1828, having become possessed of large estates in France, including the Château Margaux, famous for its wine, he was naturalized as a French citizen. He died in Spain on 14 April 1842, leaving a fortune computed at 60,000,000 francs, and a splendid collection of pictures which at his death was sold by auction.

References

Alejandro Aguado, Militar, banquero, mecenas, Armando Rubén Puente, 445 p., Edibesa, Madrid, 2007

1784 births
1842 deaths
People from Seville
Spanish art collectors
19th-century Spanish businesspeople
Burials at Père Lachaise Cemetery
Spanish military personnel of the Napoleonic Wars
French people of Spanish descent